The Czech News Agency, abbreviated to ČTK, is a national public service news agency in the Czech Republic.  It publishes in Czech and English. It discontinued its Slovak language service on 1 January 2011.

Founded on 28 October 1918, on the same day as Czechoslovakia's formation, the company has been owned by the government and used by the various regimes in the Czech lands since then. Following the Velvet Revolution of 1989, the government ceased interfering in editorial decisions. In 1993 the government relinquished control of the agency, which has since been governed by a board of seven people elected by the lower house of Parliament. Members of the board are not allowed to be politically active. The agency's state subsidy was discontinued in 1996.

It was renamed from Czechoslovak to Czech News Agency on 1 January 1993 when Czechoslovakia split. CTK, however, stayed active in the Slovak market. Its former Slovak part is a separate company under a different set-up called TASR - News Agency of the Slovak Republic.

Footnotes

News agencies based in the Czech Republic
Companies of Czechoslovakia
Publishing companies established in 1993
Photo agencies
Mass media in Prague